Nemipterus bipunctatus, the Delagoa threadfin bream, is a species of threadfin bream native to Indian oceanic seas. It is one of the most important species of commercial fisheries in India and Sri Lanka.

References

 Itis.org
 Animaldiversity Web
 WoRMS

bipunctatus
Fish of the Indian Ocean
Fish of the Red Sea
Marine fauna of East Africa
Fish described in 1830
Taxa named by Achille Valenciennes